Dummy is an American series created by Cody Heller that debuted on Quibi on April 20, 2020. The series is based on a real life experience between Heller and her partner Dan Harmon, in which she discovered that he had a sex doll. The series was originally developed as a television pilot, but the script was rewritten as a film and then split into less than 10-minute episodes to fit into the concept of Quibi.

Cast
Anna Kendrick as Cody Heller
Meredith Hagner as Barbara Himmelbaum-Harmon
Donal Logue as Dan Harmon

Episodes

Accolades

References

External links

Quibi original programming
2020s American comedy television series
2020 American television series debuts
English-language television shows
American comedy web series